OPPLE Lighting is a Chinese multinational lighting corporation headquartered in Shanghai, China. Founded in 1996, The firm's sales and service cover over 50 countries with over 30,000 sales outlets.

History

Foundation and early years
Founded in Zhongshan, Guangdong province in 1996 by Madam. Ma and Mr. Wang, OPPLE began as a manufacturer of ceiling lights and quickly moved into CFLs during its first years. In 1999–2000 Opple rolled-out its first OPPLE branded stores in China. In 2001, it moved from a China-only brand to expanding internationally in the Middle East, Europe, India and South East Asia. In 2009 it opened its global headquarters in Shanghai. In 2016 Opple was listed on the Shanghai stock exchange (SHA: 603515).

Domestic expansion

Its domestic sales network covers 95% of cities above county level through 4,000 Opple stores and 30,000 sales outlets.

Domestically, it has provided lighting for clients including Burger King, Starbucks, Adidas and Holiday Inn.

International expansion

Since 2001, OPPLE has begun expanding internationally with the opening of offices in 6 countries.
 Asia Pacific:
- OPPLE Lahore, Pakistan Office
- OPPLE New Delhi, India Office
- OPPLE Bangkok, Thailand Office
 Europe:
- OPPLE Eindhoven, Netherlands Office
 Latin America:
- OPPLE Sao Paulo, Brazil Office
 Middle East and Africa:
- OPPLE Dubai Office
- OPPLE South Africa Office

OPPLE has provided lighting to the governments of Uruguay, Thailand, South Africa and Egypt.

Plant and office expansion 

OPPLE has invested over US$150M in building the largest lighting industrial site in Asia (Wujiang production and R&D center), featuring a production floor area of over 600,000M2 as well as an attached R&D facility that employs over 400 engineers, scientists and technicians.

 1996 – Headquarters built in Zhongshan, China
 1999 – Opening of first factory in Guangdong, China
 2000 – Office opening in Wuhan, China
 2004 – Opening of first overseas branch office in Dubai, UAE
 2009 – Headquarters moved to Shanghai, China
 2012 – Opening of the OPPLE Wujiang factory (largest lighting manufacturing site in Asia) in Suzhou, China
 2012 – Opening of the Shanghai Research Application Center
 2013 – Opening of the R&D center adjacent to OPPLE Wujiang Factory
 2013 – Opening of European head-office in Eindhoven, The Netherlands
 2014 – Opening of Indian branch office in New Delhi, India
 2015 - Opening offices in Belgium and Germany
 2018 - Opening offices in Italy and Spain
 2020 - Investing in 3rd production facility in South China

Products

While OPPLE began as a CFL and ceiling fixture manufacturer, it has since expanded its product line to include a wider array of products and services. Its product line now heavily features LED, matching the global demand for more affordable and efficient lighting technology.

R&D and innovation

OPPLE's Wujiang production center is the largest industrial lighting site in Asia, featuring fully automated assembly lines. In 2012 OPPLE opened its Research Application Center in Shanghai with the goal of researching the effects of light on health and human life. In 2012 OPPLE opened a large R&D center adjacent to its Wujiang factory. The OPPLE R&D center employs 400 engineers, technicians and designers and is one of the largest of its kind in Asia.
The company maintains a US$20M annual investment in R&D and applied for over 200 patents in 2014.

International expansion
Since 2001, OPPLE has begun expanding internationally with the opening of offices in 6 countries.

Asia Pacific:
- OPPLE Lahore, Pakistan Office - OPPLE New Delhi, India Office - OPPLE Bangkok, Thailand Office

Europe:
- OPPLE Eindhoven, Netherlands Office

Latin America:
- OPPLE Sao Paulo, Brazil Office

Middle East and Africa:
- OPPLE Dubai Office - OPPLE South Africa Office

OPPLE has provided lighting to the governments of Uruguay, Thailand, South Africa and Egypt.[7]

See also

 Wujiang District, Suzhou
 Guzhen, Zhongshan

References

Electronics companies of China
Multinational companies headquartered in China
Manufacturing companies based in Shanghai
Chinese companies established in 1996
Chinese brands
Privately held companies of China
Lighting brands
1996 establishments in China
Light-emitting diodes